Yanaulsky District (Yañawıl rayonı) is an administrative and municipal district (raion), one of the fifty-four in the Republic of Bashkortostan, Russia. It is located in the northwest of the republic and borders with Perm Krai in the north, Tatyshlinsky District in the east, Burayevsky District in the southeast, Kaltasinsky District in the south, Krasnokamsky District in the southwest, and with the Udmurt Republic in the west. Its administrative center is the town of Yanaul (which is not administratively a part of the district). As of the 2010 Census, the total population of the district was 21,210.

History
The district was established in August 1930.

Administrative and municipal status
Within the framework of administrative divisions, Yanaulsky District is one of the fifty-four in the Republic of Bashkortostan. It is divided into 18 selsoviets, comprising 103 rural localities. The town of Yanaul serves as its administrative center, despite being incorporated separately as a town of republic significance—an administrative unit with the status equal to that of the districts.

As a municipal division, the district is incorporated as Yanaulsky Municipal District, with the town of republic significance of Yanaul being incorporated within it as Yanaul Urban Settlement. Its eighteen selsoviets are incorporated as eighteen rural settlements within the municipal district. The town of Yanaul serves as the administrative center of the municipal district as well.

References

Notes

Sources

Districts of Bashkortostan
States and territories established in 1930